St. Francis Xavier School may refer to:

St. Francis Xavier School, Burgos in Spain
St. Francis Xavier School, Kolkata in India
St. Francis Xavier School, Vancouver in Canada
St. Francis Xavier's School, Tsuen Wan in Hong Kong
St Francis Xavier School, North Yorkshire in England

See also
List of schools named after Francis Xavier